Adrienne Jacqueline-'s Jacob or Adrienne van Hogendorp (28 January 1857 – 19 September 1920) was a Dutch still life painter.

Jacob was born in Jakarta to Dutch parents. She trained as a painter with Martinus Wilhelmus Liernur, Simon van den Berg and Margaretha Roosenboom. She was a member of Arti et Amicitiae in Amsterdam and Pulchri Studio in The Hague.

Jacob exhibited her work at the Palace of Fine Arts at the 1893 World's Columbian Exposition in Chicago, Illinois.

Her painting Flower Still Life, was included in the 1905 book Women Painters of the World.

Hogendorp-s' Jacob died in Scheveningen.

Gallery

References

1857 births
1920 deaths
Dutch women painters
Dutch still life painters
19th-century Dutch painters
20th-century Dutch painters
19th-century Dutch women artists
20th-century Dutch women artists
People from Batavia, Dutch East Indies